Bronco (also Bronko) originally referred to a horse that bucks or is untrained.

Bronco or Broncos or Bronko may also refer to:

Places in the United States
 Bronco, California, a former settlement
 Bronco, Georgia, an unincorporated community

People
Bronco (wrestler) (born 1989), Mexican luchador enmascarado (masked professional wrestler)
Jaime Rodríguez Calderón (born 1957), aka "El Bronco", Mexican politician
Ramón Álvarez (wrestler), Dominican wrestler with the ring name "El Bronco"
José "El Bronco" Venegas, Mexican singer
Bronco Horvath (1930–2019), Canadian retired National Hockey League player
Bronco Lane (born 1945), former British Army major, author and mountain climber
Bronko Lubich (1925–2007), Hungarian professional wrestler and manager
Bronco McKart (born 1971), boxer and former World Boxing Association light middleweight champion
Bronco McLoughlin (1938–2019), Irish actor, stuntman and animal trainer
Bronco Mendenhall (born 1966), college football head coach
Bronko Nagurski (1908–1990), National Football League Hall-of-Fame player
Bronko Nagurski Jr. (1937–2011), Canadian Football League player, son of Bronko Nagurski

Music
Bronco (English band), an English rock/country band fronted by singer Jess Roden
Bronco (Mexican band), a Mexican band
Bronco: La Serie (album), a 2019 album by the Mexican band Bronco
El Bronco (album), an album by José "El Bronco" Venegas
Bronco (Canaan Smith album), 2015, or the title song
Bronco (Orville Peck album), 2022

Sports

Professional
Aspley Broncos, a rugby league team from Australia 
Bonymaen Broncos, a Welsh rugby league team founded in 2011
Brisbane Broncos, a rugby league team from Australia
Broncos de Caracas, a Venezuelan basketball team
C.D. Broncos, a Honduran soccer team
Calanda Broncos, an American football team from Switzerland
Calgary Broncos, a World Hockey Association team in the 1970s
Denver Broncos, a National Football League team
Laredo Broncos (2006–2010), a former baseball team
London Broncos, a British rugby league team
Rochester Broncos, an American Association baseball team that played only one season, in 1890
Saitama Broncos, a professional basketball team in Tokorozawa, Saitama, Japan
Wipptal Broncos, an Italian ice hockey team

Junior
Humboldt Broncos, a junior ice hockey team from Humboldt, Saskatchewan, Canada
Kamloops Broncos, a junior football team from Kamloops, British Columbia, Canada
Lethbridge Broncos, a defunct junior ice hockey team from Lethbridge, Alberta, Canada
Swift Current Broncos, a junior ice hockey team from Swift Current, Saskatchewan, Canada

Collegiate
Boise State Broncos, NCAA Division I university
Bronco Stadium
Cal Poly Pomona Broncos, NCAA Division II university
Fayetteville State University, NCAA Division II university
Santa Clara University, NCAA Division I university
State University of New York at Delhi Broncos, NJCAA university
University of Central Oklahoma Bronchos, NCAA Division II university
Western Michigan Broncos, NCAA Division I university

Other sports topics 
 Bronco, a combat robot competing in BattleBots
 Enschede Broncos, an American football club from Enschede, Netherlands
 Bucking horse, in rodeo

Vehicles
Bronco All Terrain Tracked Carrier, a Singaporean built articulated tracked carrier
Ducati Bronco, a motorcycle
Ford Bronco, a four-wheel drive utility automobile
North American Rockwell OV-10 Bronco, a military light attack and observation aircraft

Other uses
Bronco (TV series), a Western series featuring Ty Hardin
 Bronco Wine Company, a California vintner
 Fender Bronco, an electric guitar model

See also

Broncho (disambiguation)